John Bell Williams Airport  is a public use airport in Hinds County, Mississippi, United States. It is located in Bolton, Mississippi, three nautical miles (6 km) northeast of the center of Raymond, Mississippi, The airport is owned by Hinds Community College.

Although many U.S. airports use the same three-letter location identifier for the FAA and IATA, this airport is assigned JVW by the FAA but has no designation from the IATA.

History 
During World War II, Hinds County Airport was used as an auxiliary training airfield supporting the Army pilot training school at Jackson Army Air Base. It was turned over to civil use in April 1944.

Facilities and aircraft 
It has one runway designated 12/30 with an asphalt surface measuring 5,499 by 100 feet (1,676 x 30 m).

For the 12-month period ending May 6, 2011, the airport had 46,000 aircraft operations, an average of 126 per day: 98% general aviation and 2% military. At that time there were 83 aircraft based at this airport: 68% single-engine and 31% multi-engine.

See also 

 Mississippi World War II Army Airfields
 List of airports in Mississippi

References

External links 
 John Bell Williams Airport at Hinds Community College
 Aerial image as of February 1996 from USGS The National Map
 

Airports in Mississippi
Buildings and structures in Hinds County, Mississippi
Transportation in Hinds County, Mississippi
Airfields of the United States Army Air Forces in Mississippi
University and college airports